The Penrith Museum of Printing is a museum in Penrith, New South Wales, Australia with a focus on Australian letterpress printing equipment and techniques.

Establishment 
In 1987 Alan Connell (1922–2020), a retired employee of the now defunct printing company The Nepean Times, after walking past the building of the old Nepean Times in Station Street, saw that the equipment used the publication of the newspaper were still there, after 25 years of disuse. He asked the then-owner if he could have some of old equipment to preserve the heritage. The machines where stored and other letterpress equipment was added. The Museum was officially opened on 2 June 2001 by Jackie Kelly, MP for Lindsay, the then Minister for Sport and Tourism as well as with the support of industry organisations and a Commonwealth Government Federation Fund Grant.

In September 2017 the Penrith Museum of Printing closed its doors for a major upgrade and added 150 m2 to their premises including the addition of a foyer and a library. The $130,000 (AUD) upgrade has given more space to show all working machines and equipment. The museum was reopened by Penrith Councillor Brian Cartwright in November 2018.

Conservation 

The Penrith Museum of Printing houses a collection of fully operational letterpress machinery and equipment. A number of the items in the collection are over 150 years old and are still functioning. The objective of the museum is to have all equipment and machinery up and running for all to see and experience. The Penrith Museum of Printing currently has several early 1900 Linotype and Intertype line cast machines, a Columbian press from 1841, a Albion from 1864, the Nepean Times Wharfedale stop cylinder press from around 1880, Chandler & Price, Arab and Pearl treadle presses, Heidelberg platen and a Miehle vertical cylinder press.

The museum featured in the 2018 film Ladies in Black, where it was used to simulate the Sydney Morning Herald's  compositors' room.

List of machines and equipment on display

Library 
The Penrith Museum of Printing has an extensive collection of books, manuals, documents and other letterpress printing artefacts which are all available for viewing.

While the Museum does not loan books or items from its collection, it is open to view and or study this collection during opening hours.

See also 
 The Nepean Times
 List of newspapers in Australia
 Museums and Galleries in NSW, Australia 
 Isaacs, Victor, Kirkpatrick, Rod and Russell, John (2004). Australian Newspaper History: A Bibliography

References

External links 
 
 Penrith Museum of Printing reopens after renovations 
 Debate Gutenberg vs Coster in the Penrith Museum of Printing 
 Penrith Museum produces Gutenberg models 
 Visit to Penrith (Australia) Printing Museum, reopened after an eighteen month closure for extension work.

Museums in Sydney
Printing museums in Australia